Nash Range is a mainly ice-covered coastal range, 40 nautical miles (70 km) long, bordering the west side of the Ross Ice Shelf between Dickey and Nimrod Glaciers. Named by the Ross Sea Committee for Walter Nash who, as Leader of the Opposition and later as Prime Minister of New Zealand, gave strong support to New Zealand participation in the Commonwealth Trans-Antarctic Expedition, 1956–58.

Features
Geographical features include:

 Algie Glacier
 Babis Spur
 Ballard Spur
 Bridge Pass
 Cape Wilson
 Jacobs Peninsula
 Lowe Peak
 Mount Arcone
 Mount Canopus
 Mount Christmas
 Ricker Dome

Mountain ranges of the Ross Dependency
Transantarctic Mountains
Shackleton Coast